USS LST-740 was an  laid down on 12 February 1944 by the Dravo Corporation at Neville Island. She was launched on 8 April 1944, sponsored by Miss A. Jean Blocker, and commissioned on 15 May 1944.

During World War II, LST-740 was assigned to the Asiatic-Pacific theater and participated in the Morotai landings—September 1944; the Leyte landings—October and November 1944; the Lingayen Gulf landing—January 1945; the Mindanao Island landings—April 1945; and the Balikpapan operation—June and July 1945.

Following the war, LST-740 performed occupation duty in the Far East until late October 1945. She returned to the United States and was decommissioned on 8 March 1946 and struck from the Navy list on 12 April that same year. On 14 June 1948, the ship was sold to the Oil Transport Co., of New Orleans, Louisiana, for non-self-propelled operation.

LST-740 earned five battle stars for World War II service.

References

External links
 History and Story of the LST 740

LST-542-class tank landing ships
World War II amphibious warfare vessels of the United States
1944 ships
Ships built by Dravo Corporation